Okumoto is a Japanese surname. Notable people with the surname include:

, Japanese musician
, American actor and filmmaker
 

Japanese-language surnames